Diplocarpon is a genus of fungi in the family Drepanopezizaceae. The genus contains 6 species.

Species 

Diplocarpon earlianum
Diplocarpon hymenaeae
Diplocarpon impressum
Diplocarpon mali
Diplocarpon mespili
Diplocarpon polygoni
Diplocarpon rosae
Diplocarpon saponariae
Diplocarponella coprosmae
Diplocarponella graminea
Diplocarponella schoepfiae

See also 

 List of Dermateaceae genera

References

External links 

 Diplocarpon at Index Fungorum

Dermateaceae genera